Tamara Bos (born 13 August 1967, Ede) is a Dutch screenwriter who won the Golden Calf for Best Script for Winky's Horse.

Partial filmography 
Brammetje Baas
Diep

Mijn Franse tante Gazeuse
Minoes
Tow Truck Pluck
Where Is Winky's Horse?
Winky's Horse

TV 
Cowboy from Iran

References

External links

1967 births
Living people
Dutch children's writers
Dutch women children's writers
Dutch women screenwriters
Dutch screenwriters
Golden Calf winners
People from Ede, Netherlands